The Simurq PFC 2011–12 season was Simurq PFC's sixth Azerbaijan Premier League season. They started the season under the management of Sergei Yuran, before his contract was mutually terminated on 5 March.  Igor Getman  was appointed as the club's caretaker manager from the 5th to 11 March, when  Giorgi Chikhradze was then appointed as their permanent manager. They finished the season in 9th position and were knocked out of the Azerbaijan Cup at the first round stage by vs Neftchi Baku.

Squad

Transfers

Summer

In:

Out:

Winter

In:

 

 

Out:

Competitions

Azerbaijan Premier League

Results summary

Results

Table

Azerbaijan Premier League Relegation Group

Results summary

Results

Table

Azerbaijan Cup

Squad statistics

Appearances and goals

|-
|colspan="14"|Players who appeared for Simurq no longer at the club:

|}

Goal scorers

Disciplinary record

Notes
The match is played without spectators.
Qarabağ have played their home games at the Tofiq Bahramov Stadium since 1993 due to the ongoing situation in Quzanlı.

References

External links 
 Official Website
 Simurq at Soccerway.com

Simurq PIK seasons
Simurq